This is a list of symphonies in E-flat major written by notable composers.

See also
List of symphonies by key.

References

E flat major
Symphonies